Esmailabad (also Romanized as Esmā‘īlābād; also known as Esmā‘īlābād-e Marvdasht and Esma‘īlābād Marvdasht) is a village in Band-e Amir Rural District, Zarqan District, Shiraz County, Fars Province, Iran. In 2006, its population was 75, in 20 families.

References 

Populated places in Zarqan County